The Scorpio and Jones families are fictional families on the American soap opera General Hospital, which is set in the fictional town of Port Charles, New York. Over time, the two families intertwined and became one large blended family, often referred to as the Scorpio/Jones family. The Scorpio family was introduced in December 1980 by head writers Pat Falken Smith and Margaret DePriest, when Robert Scorpio arrived in town to assist Luke Spencer in locating a rare diamond called the  Ice Princess. Four years later, the Jones family was introduced in 1984 by Gloria Monty when Frisco Jones arrived in town after he is hired to be the lead singer for "Blackie and the Riff Raff". The Scorpio and Jones families are known for their many adventures, with members of both families working as secret agents with the fictional World Security Bureau (WSB).

Family members

First generation

 Andrew Jones Sr. (Mentioned character)  Andrew Sr. is mentioned as the father of Tony and Frisco Jones. Andrew Sr. married a woman named Cindy, with whom he had his two sons, Anthony (Tony) and Andrew Jr. (Frisco).  After Cindy's death, he quickly married his wife's nurse, Rita. Andrew and Rita did not have any children. Andrew Sr. appeared onscreen in 1984 during a brief flashback as his younger son shares the story of their troubled relationship with his girlfriend, Felicia.

Second generation
 Robert Xavier Scorpio (Tristan Rogers)  The oldest Scorpio brother. Robert arrived in town as an international spy for the WSB and was involved in many adventures with his wife, Holly Sutton and friend Luke Spencer. In 1992, he and his ex-wife, Anna Devane, were both presumed dead after a boat explosion. Robert returned to town alive in 2006. Robert has one daughter, Robin Scorpio, with Anna.
 Malcolm "Mac" Scorpio (John J. York)  The younger Scorpio brother. Mac was introduced in 1991 upon his arrival in town. He had a very volatile relationship with his brother due to years of estrangement. Over time, the relationship thawed and improved as they put aside their differences. Mac is the owner of The Floating Rib. While Mac never had any children of his own, he married Felicia Jones and raised her two daughters, Maxie and Georgie, and also his niece, Robin, after her parents were presumed dead.
 Anthony "Tony" Jones (Brad Maule)  Andrew and Cindy's older son. He arrived in Port Charles in 1984, seeking to mend fences with his brother while working as a neurologist at General Hospital. Tony had a daughter, B.J., with Tania Roskov, and adopted a son, Lucas, with Bobbie Spencer. Tony died in February 2006 during the encephalitis epidemic at General Hospital.
 Andrew "Frisco" Jones Jr. (Jack Wagner)  Andrew and Cindy's younger son, Frisco was introduced in January 1984 as lead singer for the band, Blackie and the Riff-Raff. He later became an agent, and is now head of the WSB. He goes missing and is presumed dead the following year, but returns alive, having escaped the Bulgarian prison where he had been held and tortured. Frisco has two daughters, Maxie and Georgie, with Felicia Cummings.
 Prunella Witherspoon (Chantal Contouri)  Prunella is the cousin of Mac and Robert Scorpio. She appeared briefly in 1988 as a con artist.

Third generation
 Robin Scorpio-Drake (Kimberly McCullough)  Robert's only child with his first wife, Anna Devane. Robin initially was raised by Filomena Soltini, a woman she considers her grandmother, then by her uncle Mac after her parents are presumed dead. Robin contracts HIV from her first love, Stone Cates. She is a doctor specializing in neuropathology. Robin has two children: Emma Drake and Noah Robert Drake. Robin was presumed dead, but later rescued from captivity. She currently lives in Berkeley, California with her family.
 Mariah Maximilliana "Maxie" Jones (Kirsten Storms)  Frisco's oldest daughter with Felicia Cummings, born onscreen in 1990 revised to 1986, and named after her maternal great-grandmother, Mariah Ramirez, and her royal ancestor, the Emperor Maximillian. Maxie is raised primarily by her mother and her stepfather, Mac Scorpio. Maxie resented Frisco and Felicia because she felt abandoned by them, but later reconciles with both of them. Maxie works as the Vice President of Deception Cosmetics. She is the mother of Georgie Spinelli, James West, and Louise Jones.
 Georgianna "Georgie" Jones (Lindze Letherman)  Frisco's youngest daughter with Felicia Cummings, born onscreen in 1995 revised to 1989 then 1990. Georgie is viewed as the smart, sensible sister in comparison to her feistier older sister, Maxie. She was raised by Felicia, and her stepfather, Mac, but she never resented Frisco or Felicia for not always being there. She is murdered in 2007 by Diego Alcazar, the Text Message Killer.
 Barbara Jean "B.J." Jones (Brighton Hertford)  Tony's daughter with Tania Roskov, born onscreen in 1986. She was named Barbara Jean in honor of nurse Barbara Jean "Bobbie" Spencer, who helped deliver her. After Tania died, B.J. was adopted by Bobbie, who married Tony. In a tragic twist of fate, B.J. dies in 1994 after a school bus accident left her brain dead, and her heart was transplanted into her dying cousin, Maxie, who was suffering from Kawasaki syndrome. The story of B.J.'s heart is continually mentioned on General Hospital to the present day.
Lucas Stansbury Jones (Matt Trudeau)  Tony's adopted son with Bobbie Spencer. Lucas is the biological son of Julian Jerome and Cheryl Stansbury. He was illegally bought by Bobbie, but later returned to Cheryl when his true parentage was revealed. After Cheryl's death, Lucas is adopted by Tony and Bobbie. Lucas is a doctor at General Hospital, following Tony and Bobbie's footsteps. He comes out as gay before Tony's death, who accepts his son right before he dies.
Cody Bell (Josh Kelly)  Mac's son with Dominique Stanton.

Fourth generation
 Emma Grace Scorpio Drake (Brooklyn Rae Silzer)  Robin's daughter with Patrick Drake, born onscreen November 3, 2008 revised to October 28,2005.
 Georgianna "Georgie" Spinelli (Lily Fisher) Maxie's daughter with Damian Spinelli. Maxie tries to pass the baby off as the child of Lulu and Dante Falconeri after miscarrying as their surrogate. When her true parentage was revealed, she was returned to Maxie and Spinelli. She is named after Maxie's sister, Georgie Jones.
 Noah Robert Scorpio-Drake  Robin's son with Patrick Drake, born around July 2017 in Berkeley, California. He is named after both his grandfathers, Noah Drake and Robert Scorpio.
 James Malcolm West  Maxie’s son with Nathan West, born onscreen May 21, 2018. He is named after his late father, whose legal name was James, and Mac Scorpio, Maxie's stepfather who raised her.
 Wiley Cooper-Jones  Lucas' adopted son with Brad Cooper. He is the biological son of Willow Tait and Hank Archer, and was adopted by Lucas and Brad at birth. He died of SIDS shortly after birth.
 Bailey Louise Jones  Maxie's daughter with Peter August, born onscreen May 27, 2021. To protect her from Peter, Maxie gave Louise to Brook Lynn Quartermaine, who passed off Bailey as her daughter with Valentin Cassadine. After Peter's death, Maxie was able to bring Bailey home.

In-Laws
Cindy Jones (Mentioned character) - Andrew Sr.'s wife (dissolved)
Rita Lloyd Jones (Kim Terry-Costin)  - Andrew Sr.'s wife 
Holly Sutton-Scorpio (Emma Samms) - Robert's wife (1983–92) 
Anna Devane (Finola Hughes) - Robert's wife (1970s; 1991–92) 
Barbara Jean "Bobbie" Spencer (Jacklyn Zeman) - Tony's wife (1989–96) 
Tania Jones (Hilary Edson) - Tony's wife (1985–87) 
Felicia Jones (Kristina Wagner) - Frisco's wife (1986–94); Mac's wife (1998–2001, 2013—) 
Patrick Drake (Jason Thompson) - Robin's husband (2008–14, 2016—) 
Dillon Quartermaine (Scott Clifton) - Georgie's husband (2006) 
Matthew "Matt" Hunter (Jason Cook) - Maxie's husband (2012) 
Bradley "Brad" Cooper (Parry Shen) - Lucas' husband (2016–20)
Nathan West (Ryan Paevey) - Maxie's husband (2017–18)

Scorpio

Family tree
Legend

Descendants

 Unnamed man (deceased); married Unnamed woman (deceased)
 Robert Scorpio (1954–); Brother of Mac; married Anna Devane (1976-1980, 1991–92), Holly Sutton (1983–92)
 Robin Scorpio (1977–); Robert and Anna's daughter; married Patrick Drake (2008–14, 2016–)
 Emma Drake (2002–); Robin and Patrick's daughter
 Noah Drake (2017–); Robin and Patrick's son
  Mac Scorpio (1963–); Brother of Robert; married Felicia Jones (1998–2000, 2013–)
 Maxie Jones (1986–); Felicia's daughter with Frisco Jones, raised by Mac; married Matt Hunter (2012), Nathan West (2017–18)
 Georgie Spinelli (2013–); Maxie's daughter with Damian Spinelli 
 James West (2018–); Maxie and Nathan's son
  Bailey Jones (2021–); Maxie's daughter with Peter August
 Georgie Jones (1990–2007); Felicia's daughter with Frisco Jones, raised by Mac; married Dillon Quartermaine (2006)

Jones

Family tree

Descendants

 Andrew Jones, Sr. (deceased); married Cindy Jones (dissolved), Rita Jones
 Tony Jones (1952–2006); Andrew and Cindy's son; married Tania Roskov (1985–87), Lucy Coe (divorced), Bobbie Spencer (1989–96)
 B. J. Jones (1986–94); Tony and Tania's daughter
 Lucas Jones (1987–); Tony & Bobbie's adopted son; married Brad Cooper (2016–20)
 Wiley Cooper-Jones (2018); Lucas and Brad's adoptive son
 Frisco Jones (1960–); Andrew and Cindy's son; married Felicia Cummings (1986–94)
 Maxie Jones (1986–); Frisco and Felicia's daughter; married Matt Hunter (2012), Nathan West (2017–18)
 Georgie Spinelli (2013–); Maxie's daughter with Damian Spinelli
 James West (2018–); Maxie and Nathan's son
  Bailey Jones (2021–); Maxie's daughter with Peter August
 Georgie Jones (1990–2007); Frisco and Felicia's daughter; married Dillon Quartermaine (2006)

References

General Hospital families
General Hospital characters